With Every Mistake is a collection of Gwynne Dyer's articles published between September 11, 2001 and the Iraqi election in 2005.

The articles are interspersed with commentary from Dyer which includes discussion of the issues, reflections on the Canadian publishing environment, and self-criticism for the things that he got wrong.

The title is taken from the Beatles' song, "While My Guitar Gently Weeps", by George Harrison: "With every mistake, we must surely be learning."

Contents

 "A Long Way in a Short Time"
 "Just Walking Down the Road, Minding My Own Business...2001, pre-9/11"
 "The Suddenly...September 11-December 21, 2001"
 "The Uslims: Malevolent, Mysterious and Probably Crazy"
 "Meanwhile, in Another Part of the Forest..."
 "Axis of Evil: The Subject Has Changed January–December 2002"
 "Israel and Palestine: The Long Run"
 "South Asia: Dangerous, But Getting Better"
 "Invading Iraq: The Reason Why"
 "The State of Europe"
 "Miscellany I"
 "Iraq: Vanishing WMD, Rising Resistance"
 "Catastrophes Old and Pending"
 "Africa's Travails"
 "Iraq: Shia Pressure, American Abuse, Sunni Revolt"
 "The Lost Continent"
 "East Asian Games"
 "Iraq and Terrorism: A Sense of Proportion"
 "The Fate of Israel"
 "The Rich and the Poor"
 "Miscellany II"
 "We Must Surely be Learning"

Release details
 2005, Canada, Random House Canada , Pub date 25 October 2005, Hardback
 2006, Canada, Vintage Canada , Pub date 10 October 2006, Paperback

Reviews
Review by Nathan Whitlock

External links
Full text available at Internet Archive

2005 non-fiction books
Political books
Books about the September 11 attacks
Canadian non-fiction books
Works by Gwynne Dyer